Le Val-Larrey is a commune in the Côte-d'Or department in eastern France. It was established on 1 January 2019 by merger of the former communes of Flée (the seat) and Bierre-lès-Semur.

See also
Communes of the Côte-d'Or department

References

Vallarrey
Populated places established in 2019
2019 establishments in France